Witches of the Caribbean is a 2005 horror film directed by David DeCoteau and starring Joanna Cassidy, Nicole Cavazos, Nicole Marie Monica, Kelli Giddish, Michael King, Nina Tapanin, Kyle Jordan, Ric Sarabia, Helene Udy, and Catherine Munden.

Plot summary
Seventeen-year-old Angela suffers from a recurring nightmare about a 16th-century witch burned to death on a dark and mysterious beach. To find an explanation to this nightmare and reclaim her life, she flies to a two-week retreat for troubled teens on the Caribbean island of Matau, run by noted child psychologist Professor Avebury. Little does Angela realize that Matau hides a horrific secret history, nor does she know that her nightmares stem from this very spot.

Upon her arrival, Angela meets the other troubled teenagers attending the retreat, all of whom seem to play a role in the mystery of her dream. In particular, the enigmatic Bethany claims to be a witch and secretly seduces the other teens into joining her coven.  Gradually, Angela realizes that her nightmares aren't dreams at all, but memories of her past life. As the true nature of the frightening nightmare unfolds, Bethany seems determined to either seduce or destroy Angela. With the witching hour ticking closer, Angela must solve the mystery of the Caribbean island and its legendary witch coven.

Cast
Joanna Cassidy as Professor Avebury
Nicole Cavazos as Angela
Nicole Marie Monica as Bethany Hunter
Kelli Giddish as Clara Niles
Michael King as Cutter
Nina Tapanin as Enid
Kyle Jordan as Jerry
Ric Sarabia as Magistrate Harriman
Helene Udy as Mistress Tilda Harriman
Catherine Munden as Anne Prescott

Production
The film was shot entirely in the Turks and Caicos Islands, on Grand Turk Island.

References

External links
 
  
  
 Information about Witches of the Caribbean at Regent Entertainment 

2005 horror films
2005 films
American LGBT-related films
American supernatural horror films
Films set in the Caribbean
Films shot in the Turks and Caicos Islands
Films directed by David DeCoteau
LGBT-related horror films
Films about witchcraft
2005 LGBT-related films
2000s English-language films
2000s American films